Agrotis volubilis, the voluble dart moth, is a moth of the family Noctuidae. The species was first described by Leon F. Harvey in 1874. It is found in North America, from Newfoundland to British Columbia in Canada and in the United States from Maine to Florida and west to the West Coast.

The wingspan is 35–40 mm. Adults are on wing from May to July. There is one generation per year.

The larvae feed on a wide range of plants, including Medicago sativa, Phaseolus, Cerastium, Trifolium, Zea mays, Hordeum pusillum and Nicotiana.

Subspecies
Agrotis volubilis volubilis
Agrotis volubilis fumipennis

References

"Agrotis volubilis Harvey, Voluble Dart - Biodiversity of Great Smoky Mountains National Park". Discover Life in America. Archived January 11, 2014.

Agrotis
Moths of North America
Moths described in 1874

Taxa named by Leon F. Harvey